China Cooperation Development Cycling Team is a Chinese UCI Continental cycling team established in 2015.

References

UCI Continental Teams (Asia)
Cycling teams established in 2015
Cycling teams based in China